Azaka are a family of loa in Haitian mythology. The name is shared between:
Azaka Medeh - loa of harvest
Azaka-Tonnerre - loa of thunder

See also
 Asaka (disambiguation)